Punching the Clown is a 2009 American comedy film directed by Gregori Viens and starring Henry Phillips as a semi-fictionalized version of himself.

Premise
Henry (Phillips) is a struggling singer-songwriter comic in Los Angeles who suddenly finds success and then is subjected to the cruelty of show business.

Production
The film includes both scripted scenes as well as portions of actual live performances by Phillips.

Reception
Punching the Clown has been received positively by critics and holds an 86% rating on Rotten Tomatoes. The film also won the Audience Award at the 2009 Slamdance Film Festival.

References

External links
 
 

2009 films
American comedy films
2009 comedy films
Films about comedians
2000s English-language films
2000s American films